Devenilia is a genus of moths in the family Geometridae.

Species
 Devenilia corearia (Leech, 1891)

References
 Devenilia at Markku Savela's Lepidoptera and Some Other Life Forms
 Natural History Museum Lepidoptera genus database

Ennominae